Vladimir Putin Peak is a mountain of the Kyrgyz Ala-Too Range mountain range in the Tian Shan system. It is located in the Chuy Region of Kyrgyzstan. It was named on 17 February 2011 after the second president of the Russian Federation Vladimir Putin; it was previously unnamed.

See also 
 Boris Yeltsin Peak (Kyrgyzstan) - named in 2002 for the first president of the Russian Federation Boris Yeltsin.

References

External links
 Map K-43-053

Mountains of Kyrgyzstan
Chüy Region
Vladimir Putin
Four-thousanders of the Tian Shan